Column Five Media (often referred to as Column Five) is a visual communication agency located in Costa Mesa, California, and Brooklyn, New York, specializing in data visualization, infographics, motion graphics, and social media marketing. The company ranked #291 on the Inc. 500 2013 list of the fastest-growing media companies in the U.S., including #5 of the top 100 media companies, and is most notable for creating and producing the viral video "Child of the 90s" on behalf of Internet Explorer.

History
Column Five was founded by Ross Crooks, Josh Ritchie, and Jason Lankow in 2009 in Orange County, California. The company began by creating infographic designs for Bay Area startups but soon began to service worldwide brands including Microsoft, Facebook, Intuit, and GE. After initially gaining recognition thanks to its work in major print publications such as The Wall Street Journal, Time, and GOOD, Column Five expanded its data design work to include motion graphics, interactives, business presentations, media installations, and live-action video.

In 2011, founders Crooks, Ritchie, and Lankow were approached by Columbia University to craft and teach a graduate course in the burgeoning field of data design. The course, Visualization of Information, is offered as part of the school's M.S. program in information and knowledge strategy. Crooks, Ritchie, and Lankow have spoken at organizations such as the CDC, World Bank, Federal Reserve, American Institute of Graphic Arts, as well as events such as SXSW  and NFL Digital Media Summit. Crooks is a contributing editor to Forbes.  Their book, Infographics - The Power of Visual Storytelling (published by Wiley in 2012), details the practical applications for data visualization in marketing and business.

Works

"Child of the 90s"
Column Five produced the "Child of the 90s" ad in conjunction with Internet Explorer for the company's "Browser You Loved to Hate" campaign. The video was published Jan 23, 2013, and went viral within the week, receiving more than 4.3 million hits in its first four days. The video was ranked #3 on AdWeek Top 10 Viral Ads of 2013  and was nominated for multiple awards. It won the Gold award in the Best Film category for Ads of the World January 2013. It received Webby nominations for Best Online Commercial and Best Viral Marketing, as well as Mashie nominations for Best Viral Video and Best In Show. In addition to recognition, "Child of the 90s" received significant media coverage in publications such as Huffington Post and Time.

In March 2014, Column Five was selected to debut and pitch Visage, its new data visualization software platform, at SXSW Interactive as part of the ReleaseIt at SXSW contest. Visage won first place in the contest, deemed Most Likely to Succeed by the panel of judges.

References

Companies based in Newport Beach, California
Mass media companies of the United States
2009 establishments in California